Pomerania Province may refer to one of several provinces established in Pomerania, a region of Europe:

Swedish Pomerania (1630–1815), a historical province of Sweden
Province of Pomerania (1653–1815), a historical province of Brandenburg, later Brandenburg-Prussia 
Province of Pomerania (1815–1945), a historical province of Prussia, later Germany

See also
Pomerania (disambiguation)
Pomeranian Voivodeship, the name of several historical and one current province of Poland
West Pomeranian Voivodeship
Kuyavian-Pomeranian Voivodeship

Province name disambiguation pages